Amolops (commonly known as cascade frogs or sucker frogs) is a genus of true frogs (family Ranidae) native mainly to eastern and south-eastern Asia. These frogs are closely related to such genera as Huia, Meristogenys, Odorrana, Pelophylax and Rana, but still form a distinct lineage among the core radiation of true frogs. They are commonly known as "torrent frogs" after their favorite habitat - small rapid-flowing mountain and hill streams - but this name is used for many similar-looking frogs regardless of whether they are loosely related.

Several species are highly convergent with other Ranidae "torrent frogs". A. archotaphus and its relatives for example very much resemble Odorrana livida. In another incidence of convergent evolution yielding adaptation to habitat, the tadpoles of Amolops, Huia, Meristogenys as well as Rana sauteri have a raised and usually well-developed sucker on their belly. This is useful in keeping in place in rocky torrents, where these frogs grow up. But as Odorrana and Staurois from comparable habitat prove, this sucker is by no means a necessity and other means of adaptation to torrent habitat exist.

Species
The delimitation of this genus has proven complicated, with many species believed to belong elsewhere. Due to the degree of convergent evolution, DNA sequence studies are very helpful in assigning species to the genera, though the possibility of past hybridization cannot be discounted in Ranidae.

New species are described on a regular basis. At least one undescribed species is known to exist, a very distinct form from Phetchaburi in Thailand that is possibly closer to A. marmoratus than to most others.

 Amolops afghanus (Günther, 1858)
 Amolops akhaorum Stuart, Bain, Phimmachak, and Spence, 2010
 Amolops albispinus Sung, Hu, Wang, Liu, and Wang, 2016
 Amolops aniqiaoensis Dong, Rao, and Lü, 2005
 Amolops archotaphus (Inger and Chan-ard, 1997)
 Amolops assamensis Sengupta et al., 2008
 Amolops australis Chan, Abraham, Grismer, and Grismer, 2018
 Amolops bellulus Liu, Yang, Ferraris, and Matsui, 2000
 Amolops caelumnoctis Rao and Wilkinson, 2007
 Amolops chakrataensis Ray, 1992
 Amolops chayuensis Sun, Luo, Sun, and Zhang, 2013
 Amolops chunganensis (Pope, 1929)
 Amolops compotrix (Bain, Stuart, and Orlov, 2006)
 Amolops cremnobatus Inger and Kottelat, 1998
 Amolops cucae (Bain, Stuart, and Orlov, 2006)
 Amolops daiyunensis (Liu & Hu, 1975)
 Amolops daorum (Bain, Lathrop, Murphy, Orlov, and Ho, 2003)
 Amolops formosus (Günther, 1876)
 Amolops gerbillus (Annandale, 1912)
 Amolops gerutu Chan, Abraham, Grismer, and Grismer, 2018
 Amolops granulosus (Liu and Hu, 1961)
 Amolops hainanensis (Boulenger, 1900)
 Amolops himalayanus (Boulenger, 1888)
 Amolops hongkongensis (Pope and Romer, 1951) – Hong Kong Cascade Frog
 Amolops indoburmanensis Dever, Fuiten, Konu, and Wilkinson, 2012
 Amolops iriodes (Bain and Nguyen, 2004)
 Amolops jaunsari Ray, 1992
 Amolops jinjiangensis Su, Yang, and Li, 1986
 Amolops kaulbacki (Smith, 1940)
 Amolops kohimaensis Biju, Mahony, and Kamei, 2010
 Amolops larutensis (Boulenger, 1899)
 Amolops lifanensis (Liu, 1945)
 Amolops loloensis (Liu, 1950)
 Amolops longimanus (Andersson, 1939)
 Amolops mantzorum  (David, 1872)
 Amolops marmoratus (Blyth, 1855)
 Amolops medogensis Li and Rao, 2005
 Amolops mengdingensis Yu, Wu, and Yang, 2019
 Amolops mengyangensis Wu and Tian, 1995
 Amolops minutus Orlov and Ho, 2007
 Amolops monticola (Anderson, 1871)
 Amolops nidorbellus Biju, Mahony, and Kamei, 2010
 Amolops nyingchiensis Jiang, Wang, Xie, Jiang, and Che, 2016
 Amolops ottorum Pham, Sung, Pham, Le, Ziegler, and Nguyen, 2019
 Amolops pallasitatus Qi, Zhou, Lyu, Lu, and Li, 2019
 Amolops panhai Matsui & Nabhitabhata, 2006
 Amolops ricketti (Boulenger, 1899)
 Amolops shuichengicus Lyu and Wang, 2019
 Amolops sinensis Lyu, Wang, and Wang, 2019
 Amolops spinapectoralis Inger, Orlov, and Darevsky, 1999
 Amolops splendissimus Orlov and Ho, 2007
 Amolops torrentis (Smith, 1923)
 Amolops tuberodepressus Liu and Yang, 2000
 Amolops viridimaculatus (Jiang, 1983)
 Amolops vitreus (Bain, Stuart, and Orlov, 2006)
 Amolops wenshanensis Yuan, Jin, Li, Stuart, and Wu, 2018
 Amolops wuyiensis (Liu and Hu, 1975)
 Amolops xinduqiao Fei, Ye, Wang, and Jiang, 2017
 Amolops yatseni Lyu, Wang, and Wang, 2019
 Amolops yunkaiensis Lyu, Wang, Liu, Zeng, and Wang, 2018

Footnotes

References
  (2007): Paraphyly of Chinese Amolops (Anura, Ranidae) and phylogenetic position of the rare Chinese frog, Amolops tormotus. Zootaxa 1531: 49–55. PDF abstract and first page text
  (2008): The phylogenetic problem of Huia (Amphibia: Ranidae). Mol. Phylogenet. Evol. 46(1): 49–60.  (HTMl abstract)

 
Amphibian genera
Frogs of Asia
Taxa named by Edward Drinker Cope